Mallett House or Mallet House or Mallette Cabin or variations may refer to:

Places

England 
Mallet Court, the manor house of Curry Mallet, in Somerset

Switzerland 
Mallet House and Museum international de la Réforme, a cultural property in Geneva

United States
George W. Mallett House, Princeton, Arkansas, listed on the National Register of Historic Places (NRHP) in Dallas County, Arkansas
Mallett, David Jr. House, Trumbull, Connecticut, also known as The Mallett House, NRHP-listed, in Fairfield County
Joseph Mallet House, Davenport, Iowa, listed on the NRHP in Scott County, Iowa
Mallett Hall (Lee, Maine), listed on the NRHP in Penobscot County, Maine
Mallett Hall (Pownal Center, Maine), listed on the NRHP in Cumberland County, Maine
Orin Mallette Cabin, Red River, New Mexico, listed on the NRHP in Taos County, New Mexico
Sylvester M. Mallette Cabin, Red River, New Mexico, listed on the NRHP in Taos County, New Mexico
Mallet House (University of Virginia), a dorm at Brown College at Monroe Hill, in Virginia

See also
Mallett Hall (disambiguation)
E.B. Mallett Office Building, Freeport, Maine, listed on the NRHP in Cumberland County, Maine
Mallett (disambiguation)